Roei Shukrani (or Roee, ; born 26 June 1990) is an Israeli footballer currently playing for Bnei Sakhnin.

Early life
Shukrani was born in Karmi'el, Israel, to a family of Sephardic Jewish descent.

References

External links

Living people
1990 births
Israeli footballers
Hapoel Haifa F.C. players
Hapoel Nof HaGalil F.C. players
Hapoel Ironi Kiryat Shmona F.C. players
Hapoel Ra'anana A.F.C. players
Hapoel Acre F.C. players
Bnei Sakhnin F.C. players
Israeli Premier League players
Liga Leumit players
Footballers from Karmiel
Association football midfielders
Israeli Sephardi Jews
Israeli Mizrahi Jews